The 2023 Aragonese regional election will be held on Sunday, 28 May 2023, to elect the 11th Cortes of the autonomous community of Aragon. All 67 seats in the Cortes will be up for election. The election will be held simultaneously with regional elections in eleven other autonomous communities and local elections all throughout Spain.

The previous election had seen the establishment of a coalition government by the Spanish Socialist Workers' Party (PSOE), Podemos, Aragonese Union (CHA) and the Aragonese Party (PAR) under two-term Aragonese president Javier Lambán.

Overview

Electoral system
The Cortes of Aragon are the devolved, unicameral legislature of the autonomous community of Aragon, having legislative power in regional matters as defined by the Spanish Constitution and the Aragonese Statute of Autonomy, as well as the ability to vote confidence in or withdraw it from a regional president.

Voting for the Cortes is on the basis of universal suffrage, which comprised all nationals over 18 years of age, registered in Aragon and in full enjoyment of their political rights. Additionally, Aragonese people abroad are required to apply for voting before being permitted to vote, a system known as "begged" or expat vote. The 67 members of the Cortes of Aragon are elected using the D'Hondt method and a closed list proportional representation, with an electoral threshold of three percent of valid votes—which includes blank ballots—being applied in each constituency. Seats are allocated to constituencies, corresponding to the provinces of Huesca, Teruel and Zaragoza, with each being allocated an initial minimum of 13 seats and the remaining 28 being distributed in proportion to their populations (provided that the seat-to-population ratio in the most populated province did not exceed 2.75 times that of the least populated one).

The use of the D'Hondt method may result in a higher effective threshold, depending on the district magnitude.

Election date
The term of the Cortes of Aragon expires four years after the date of their previous election, unless they are dissolved earlier. The election decree shall be issued no later than the twenty-fifth day prior to the date of expiry of parliament and published on the following day in the Official Gazette of Aragon (BOA), with election day taking place on the fifty-fourth day from publication. The previous election was held on 26 May 2019, which means that the legislature's term will expire on 26 May 2023. The election decree shall be published in the BOA no later than 2 May 2023, with the election taking place on the fifty-fourth day from publication, setting the latest possible election date for the Assembly on Sunday, 25 June 2023.

The president has the prerogative to dissolve the Cortes of Aragon and call a snap election, provided that no motion of no confidence is in process and that dissolution does not occur before one year has elapsed since the previous one. In the event of an investiture process failing to elect a regional president within a two-month period from the first ballot, the Cortes shall be automatically dissolved and a fresh election called.

In November 2021, following emerging speculation on possible snap elections in Andalusia and Castile and León to be called by the spring of 2022, as well as a similar move in the Valencian Community being considered by Valencian president Ximo Puig, it transpired that Lambán had been evaluating the opportunity of a simultaneous early election in Aragon in order to catch the regional People's Party (PP) leaderless and off-guard and to benefit from an improving economic situation. Lambán himself ruled out such possibility on 11 November and maintained that the election would be held in May 2023.

Parliamentary composition
The table below shows the composition of the parliamentary groups in the Cortes at the present time.

Parties and candidates
The electoral law allows for parties and federations registered in the interior ministry, coalitions and groupings of electors to present lists of candidates. Parties and federations intending to form a coalition ahead of an election are required to inform the relevant Electoral Commission within ten days of the election call, whereas groupings of electors need to secure the signature of at least one percent of the electorate in the constituencies for which they seek election, disallowing electors from signing for more than one list of candidates.

Below is a list of the main parties and electoral alliances which will likely contest the election:

In September 2021, citizen collectives of the so-called "Empty Spain" ( or España Vaciada), a coined term to refer to Spain's rural and largely unpopulated interior provinces, agreed to look forward for formulas to contest the next elections in Spain, inspired by the success of the Teruel Existe candidacy (Spanish for "Teruel Exists") in the November 2019 Spanish general election. By December 2021, the platform was seeking to field candidacies in all three Aragonese provinces ahead of the next regional election.

Opinion polls
The tables below list opinion polling results in reverse chronological order, showing the most recent first and using the dates when the survey fieldwork was done, as opposed to the date of publication. Where the fieldwork dates are unknown, the date of publication is given instead. The highest percentage figure in each polling survey is displayed with its background shaded in the leading party's colour. If a tie ensues, this is applied to the figures with the highest percentages. The "Lead" column on the right shows the percentage-point difference between the parties with the highest percentages in a poll.

Graphical summary

Voting intention estimates
The table below lists weighted voting intention estimates. Refusals are generally excluded from the party vote percentages, while question wording and the treatment of "don't know" responses and those not intending to vote may vary between polling organisations. When available, seat projections determined by the polling organisations are displayed below (or in place of) the percentages in a smaller font; 34 seats are required for an absolute majority in the Cortes of Aragon.

Voting preferences
The table below lists raw, unweighted voting preferences.

Preferred President
The table below lists opinion polling on leader preferences to become president of the Government of Aragon.

Results

Overall

Notes

References
Opinion poll sources

Other

Aragon
2020s
2023 regional elections in Spain